1996 Yokohama Marinos season

Review and events

League results summary

League results by round

Competitions

Domestic results

J.League

Emperor's Cup

J.League Cup

Super Cup

Sanwa Bank Cup

International results

Asian Club Championship

Player statistics

 † player(s) joined the team after the opening of this season.

Transfers

In:

Out:

Transfers during the season

In
 Takayuki Nakamaru (from River Plate)
 Darío Damián Figueroa (on September)

Out
 Gorosito (on August)
 Masahiro Fukazawa (loan to River Plate on August)

Awards

J.League Best XI:  Masami Ihara

References

Other pages
 J. League official site
 Yokohama F. Marinos official site

Yokohama Marinos
Yokohama F. Marinos seasons